LJM can stand  for:

 LJM (Lea Jeffrey Matthew), a company set up by former Enron CFO Andrew Fastow
 Limited Joint Mobility, a complication of diabetes
 Liberation and Justice Movement, a Darfur rebel groukplp
 Liverpool John Moores University